Johan Gustav Emil Sjögren (16 June 1853, Stockholm – 1 March 1918, Knivsta) was a Swedish composer.

Born in Stockholm, Sjögren entered the Stockholm Conservatory at the age of seventeen and later continued his studies at the Berlin Conservatory.

From 1890, he served as the organist at the Saint John's Church in Stockholm until shortly before his death on 1 March 1918.

Sjögren is remembered best for his lieder and piano music.  Other noteworthy works include three preludes and fugues for organ, five violin sonatas, as well as pieces for choir.

External links
Official commemorative website

1853 births
1918 deaths
19th-century classical composers
19th-century Swedish people
20th-century classical composers
Musicians from Stockholm
Romantic composers
Swedish classical composers
Swedish male classical composers
Swedish classical organists
Male classical organists
Swedish classical pianists
Male classical pianists
19th-century classical pianists
20th-century Swedish male musicians
20th-century Swedish musicians
19th-century male musicians